The 2009–10 Slovak Extraliga season was the 17th season of the Slovak Extraliga since its creation after the breakup of Czechoslovakia and the Czechoslovak First Ice Hockey League in 1993.

Regular season

Standings

Key - GP: Games played, W: Wins, OTW/SOW: Overtime/Shootout wins, OTL/SOL: Overtime/Shootout losses, L: Losses, GF: Goals for, GA: Goals against, PTS: Points.

Statistics

Scoring leaders 
 
GP = Games played; G = Goals; A = Assists; Pts = Points; +/– = Plus/minus; PIM = Penalty minutes

Leading goaltenders 
These are the leaders in GAA among goaltenders that have played at least 1200 minutes.

GP = Games played; TOI = Time on ice (minutes); GA = Goals against; Sv% = Save percentage; GAA = Goals against average

Playoffs

Playoff bracket

Quarterfinals
 Slovan – Zvolen 4–1 (8–2, 1–6, 4–1, 3–2PS, 3–2OT)
 Banská Bystrica – Nitra 2–4 (3–4PS, 2–1, 3–0, 1–4, 2–4, 3–4PS)
 Košice – Poprad 4–1 (1–0PS, 4–2, 2–4, 5–1, 8–1)
 Martin - Skalica 4–3 (2–6, 4–5PS, 7–3, 3–1, 1–3, 2–0, 4–3)

Semifinals
 Slovan – Nitra 4–0 (4–0, 5–3, 9–2, 5–2)
 Košice – Martin 4–1 (5–2, 5–3, 2–0, 1–2, 5–2)

Finals
 Slovan – Košice 2–4 (2–5, 3–6, 2–1PS, 2–3, 4–1, 2–5)

Relegation round
 Žilina – Piešťany 4–1 (4–0, 3–1, 3–2, 2–3PS, 3–1)

Playoff statistics

Playoff scoring leaders

Final rankings

References

External links
 

2009-10
2009–10 in European ice hockey leagues
Slovak